Howden was a constituency in Yorkshire which returned one Member of Parliament (MP)  to the House of Commons of the Parliament of the United Kingdom.  It was created for the 1955 general election, made up largely of the constituency of Beverley (losing some territory in the south to Haltemprice, and taking some in the east from Bridlington).

The Howden constituency was abolished for the 1983 general election.

Boundaries
The Urban Districts of Driffield and Norton, and the Rural Districts of Derwent, Driffield, Howden, Norton, and Pocklington.

Members of Parliament

Election results

Elections in the 1970s

Elections in the 1960s

Elections in the 1950s

References
 Michael Kinnear, The British Voter: An Atlas and Survey Since 1885 (London: Batsford Academic and Educational Ltd., 1981, 2nd ed.)

Parliamentary constituencies in Yorkshire and the Humber (historic)